Bohdan Stanisław Likszo (alternate spelling: Bogdan) (1 January 1940 in Vilnius (Wilno), Soviet occupated Poland – 11 December 1993 in Kraków) was a Polish professional basketball player. At a height of 1.99 m (6'6 ") tall, and a weight of 106 kg (234 lbs.), he played at the center position.

Professional career
Likszo was a member of the FIBA European Selection, in 1966.

National team career
As a member of the senior Polish national basketball team, Likszo competed at the 1964 Summer Olympics, and the 1968 Summer Olympics. Likszo was the top scorer at the 1967 FIBA World Championship.

He won the silver medal at the 1963 EuroBasket, and bronze medals at EuroBasket 1965, and EuroBasket 1967.

Awards and accomplishments

Clubs
3× Polish League Champion: (1962, 1964, 1968)
FIBA European Selection: (1966)
2× Polish League Top Scorer: (1968, 1969)

Polish senior national team
EuroBasket 1963: 
EuroBasket 1965: 
EuroBasket 1967: 
FIBA World Cup Top Scorer: (1967)

References

External links
FIBA Profile
FIBA Europe Profile

1940 births
1993 deaths
Basketball players at the 1964 Summer Olympics
Basketball players at the 1968 Summer Olympics
Olympic basketball players of Poland
Polish men's basketball players
1967 FIBA World Championship players
Basketball players from Vilnius
Centers (basketball)